John Kinsella (born 3 September 1947) is an Irish retired hurler who played as a right wing-forward for the Kilkenny senior team.

Born in Bennettsbridge, County Kilkenny, Kinsella first arrived on the inter-county scene at the age of sixteen when he first linked up with the Kilkenny minor team, before later joining the under-21 team. He made his senior debut during the 1967 championship. Kinsella went on to enjoy a successful career and won two All-Ireland medals and two Leinster medals.

At club level Kinsella is a three-time championship medallist with Bennettsbridge.

Throughout his career Kinsella made 13 championship appearances. He retired from inter-county hurling following the conclusion of the 1973 championship.

References

1947 births
Living people
Bennettsbridge hurlers
Kilkenny inter-county hurlers
All-Ireland Senior Hurling Championship winners